Yanushevsky (masculine), Yanushevskaya (feminine) is a Russian-language surname, a variant of the Polish surname Januszewski. Notable people with the surname include:

Alexey Yanushevsky,  Belarusian professional computer game player 
 (1921-1879), Imperial Russian  counter admiral
Viktor Yanushevsky,  Belarusian football player

See also

Russian-language surnames